"The Rumour" is a song recorded by Australian singer Olivia Newton-John for her 1988 thirteenth studio album of the same name. It was released as the album's lead single in April 1988 through Mercury Records. The song was written by Elton John and Bernie Taupin, and it features backing vocals and piano by John.

Cash Box said that it's "the snappiest tune that Olivia's done in a long stretch and she rises to the occasion delivering a heartfelt performance."

Personnel 
 Olivia Newton-John – lead vocals, backing vocals
 Elton John – digital piano, lead and backing vocals
 James Newton Howard – additional keyboards, additional synthesizer, drum programming
 Davey Johnstone – guitar
 Neil Stubenhaus – bass
 Carlos Vega – drum overdubs
 Lenny Castro – percussion
 Kim Hutchcroft – baritone saxophone
 Gary Herbig – tenor saxophone
 Dan Higgins – tenor saxophone
 Lew McCreary – trombone
 Bill Reichenbach Jr. – trombone
 Gary Grant – trumpet
 Jerry Hey – trumpet
 Bruce Roberts – backing vocals

Charts

References 

1988 singles
1988 songs
Olivia Newton-John songs
Mercury Records singles
Song recordings produced by Elton John
Song recordings produced by James Newton Howard
Songs with music by Elton John
Songs with lyrics by Bernie Taupin